Frederick L. Lewis (born July 1, 1943) is a retired American basketball player. He played professionally in the National Basketball Association (NBA) and American Basketball Association (ABA).  He is the only player to start his career in the NBA, and play all 9 full ABA seasons (1967-1976) until the NBA/ABA merger, then sign back with the NBA.

Born in Huntington, West Virginia, Lewis was a fundamentally sound 6'0" (1.83 m) guard who could pass, shoot, and defend equally well. He attended McKeesport Area High School (in Pennsylvania) and Arizona State University before being drafted by the NBA's Cincinnati Royals.

Lewis played a prominent role on three American Basketball Association championship teams for the Indiana Pacers, averaging 16.6 points, 4.1 assists and 4.0 rebounds in seven seasons.

Career

Early years 
A 10th-round draft pick of the Cincinnati Royals in 1966, he earned a spot as Oscar Robertson's backup, averaging 4.7 points and 1.3 assists per game. "Oscar taught me a lot," Lewis is quoted on remembertheaba.com about the legend from Indianapolis. "(He) taught me how to be cool, how to handle situations instead of running all over the court helter-skelter."

Lewis was selected by San Diego in the 1967 NBA expansion draft but instead signed with the Indiana Pacers of the ABA.

Chasing the dynasty 
In 1972, Lewis scored 23 points, collected 12 rebounds and dished out 6 assists for the Pacers in Game 7 vs. the Utah Stars in the semifinals, hitting two free throws with 24 seconds left for the winning points. Lewis also led a comeback from a 20-point deficit in Game 5 vs. the New York Nets in the Finals, hitting the game-winning free throws with 17 seconds left in the contest.

Lewis was an essential piece of the Indiana Pacers dynasty. A versatile guard that could make big plays in the clutch. He averaged 16.1 points per game, 4 assist and 3.9 rebounds in seven seasons with the Pacers. He was a three time ABA champion and the 1972 Playoffs MVP.

Lewis also added four ABA All-Star appearances and the 1975 All-Star Game MVP award to his resume.

Later years 
After the Pacers lost to the Utah Stars in the 1974 finals, however, the Pacers traded Lewis, along with Brown and Daniels, to the Memphis Sounds.  Daniels, the Sounds' starting center, then injured his back after slipping in his bathtub, and Lewis was traded to the Spirits of St. Louis in exchange for replacement center Tom Owens.

Lewis averaged a career high 22.6 points per game with the Spirits in 1974–1975, was named MVP of the 1975 ABA All-Star Game, and led the young team into the playoffs.  However, Lewis suffered an ankle injury, and the Spirits bowed out to the Kentucky Colonels, the eventual champions.

After one more year with the Spirits, Lewis returned to the Pacers (who by this point had joined the NBA), and he retired in 1977 with 12,033 combined NBA/ABA career points.

ABA All-Time Team 
Freddie Lewis was selected to the ABA All-Time Team on August 23, 1997, in conjunction with the ABA 30th Anniversary reunion. It comprised the thirty best and most influential players of the ABA during its 10 years and 9 full regular seasons of operation, with respect not only to performance at the professional level but in consideration of sportsmanship, team leadership, and contributions to the growth of the league basketball, and irrespective of positions played. Only players to have played at least a portion of their careers in the ABA were eligible for selection, although performance in other leagues, most notably the NBA, was ostensibly considered. Selected and announced beside the all-time team were a most valuable player and top head coach.

Hall of Fame balloting 
Freddie Lewis is considered to be one of the greatest Indiana Pacers ever; according to The Indianapolis Star he ranks 8th all time. His 11,660 ABA points place him in the top six in ABA scoring records.

As of 2019, he is currently on the Naismith Memorial Basketball Hall of Fame class ballot waiting to join his Pacers teammates Roger Brown, Mel Daniels, George McGinnis and coach Bob "Slick" Leonard.

Retirement 
Lewis retired from professional basketball after the 1976-77 season and moved to California, where he spent nearly two decades working for Ozzie and Dan Silna, the former owners of the Spirits of St. Louis.

Lewis later moved to Washington, D.C., where he was an inner-city schoolteacher, working with young teens.

In 2002, Lewis moved back to Indianapolis with plans of joining the staff of Indianapolis' ABA 2000 team, and took over as head coach from former teammate Billy Keller during the franchise's final season.

References

External links
Career stats at basketball-reference.com
Freddie Lewis at Remember the ABA
Indystar.com Greatest Pacers of All Time
Query & Schultz Podcast Catching up with Freddie Lewis

1943 births
Living people
African-American basketball players
American men's basketball players
Arizona State Sun Devils men's basketball players
Basketball players from West Virginia
Cincinnati Royals draft picks
Cincinnati Royals players
Continental Basketball Association coaches
Eastern Arizona Gila Monsters men's basketball players
Indiana Pacers players
Memphis Sounds players
Point guards
San Diego Rockets expansion draft picks
Spirits of St. Louis players
Sportspeople from Huntington, West Virginia
21st-century African-American people
20th-century African-American sportspeople